Abdrakhimovo (Ӓbdräxim) is a rural locality (a village) in Yunusovsky Selsoviet of Mechetlinsky District, Bashkortostan, Russia. The population was 324 as of 2010. There are 5 streets.

Geography 
Abdrakhimovo is located 17 km south of Bolsheustyikinskoye (the district's administrative centre) by road. Lemez-Tamak is the nearest rural locality.

References 

Rural localities in Mechetlinsky District